The 2010–11 Top 14 competition was a French domestic rugby union club competition operated by the Ligue Nationale de Rugby (LNR). Home-and-away play began on August 13, 2010 and continued through April 2011. The regular season was followed by a three-round playoff starting in May that involved the top six teams, culminating in the final on June 4 at Stade de France. Toulouse won the Bouclier de Brennus for the 18th time, defeating Montpellier 15–10.

Season synopsis
This year's edition of the Top 14 welcomed Agen, winners of the 2010 title in the second-level Pro D2 and returning to the top flight three years after being relegated, and La Rochelle, victors in the 2009 promotion playoffs between the second- through fifth-placed teams. They took the place of Montauban and Albi, relegated at the end of the 2009–10 Top 14.

Of the two promoted teams, Agen survived, while La Rochelle were tentatively relegated after finishing second-from-bottom. The other relegated side were Bourgoin, which had barely avoided bankruptcy in the previous season. Their financial struggles continued, and they were docked 5 points for their financial issues. The deduction was ultimately immaterial, as even without it they would have finished more than 20 points adrift of 13th-place La Rochelle.

There was, however, a chance that La Rochelle would be spared the drop. During the season, Stade Français faced major financial issues, temporarily avoiding an administrative relegation in early June 2011 when president Max Guazzini announced a deal in which a Canadian foundation, working with former France national coach Bernard Laporte and an unnamed investor, would purchase a minority stake in the club. However, the planned infusion of €12 million did not materialize; Guazzini and Laporte sued the foundation, and three people had been arrested in connection with the deal as of June 24. On June 27, Guazzini met with the LNR's financial watchdog, DNACG, to discuss the club's situation. Reports indicated that if the club did not find €6.6 million by the time of the meeting, Stade would file for bankruptcy, which would result in an automatic relegation to the nominally amateur Fédérale 1. The French government had announced it would not bail out the club. The meeting ended with the announcement of a new deal by which Guazzini would sell a controlling stake in the club to a group of investors led by French technology executive Jean-Pierre Savare, keeping Stade in the Top 14 and confirming La Rochelle's relegation. As part of the deal, Guazzini stepped aside as club president in favor of Savare's son Thomas.

The season saw signs of a changing of the guard in French rugby, especially in Paris. Racing Métro reasserted itself as a national power, finishing second on the season table. Bayonne went from being reprieved from relegation to playoff contenders, ultimately missing out in the final week of the season. Montpellier went from fighting for survival through much of 2009–10 to finalists this season, winning their quarterfinal and semifinal matches away by 1 point each, and leading Toulouse for most of the final before falling short. In the end, traditional power Toulouse lifted the Bouclier de Brennus.

Previous season
The 2009–10 season saw Clermont, in their 100th season, end decades of frustration by defeating Perpignan in the final to claim their first title, having lost in all 10 of their previous final appearances. At the other end of the table, Albi, which had been promoted to the Top 14 for 2009–10, finished bottom of the table and went down. Bayonne finished second-to-bottom but avoided relegation when it was revealed that 12th-placed Montauban were filing for bankruptcy and would therefore be automatically relegated. The other newly promoted team in 2009–10, Racing Métro, enjoyed a very successful season, finishing sixth, and qualified to the quarter-finals where they narrowly lost to eventual champions Clermont.

Competition format
Each club played every other club twice. The second half of the season was conducted in the same order as the first, with the club at home in the first half of the season away in the second. This season maintained the format introduced the previous season for the knockout stage: the top two teams qualified directly to the semifinals, while teams ranked from third to sixth qualified for a quarterfinal held at the home ground of the higher-ranked team. Semifinals are traditionally held at neutral sites; this season, both were held at Stade Vélodrome in Marseille. The final was held at Stade de France.

Going into the season, the top six clubs are guaranteed of berths in the following season's Heineken Cup. The winners of the 2010–11 Heineken Cup and European Challenge Cup are assured of berths in the 2011–12 Heineken Cup regardless of their league standing, as long as they avoid relegation. This means that if a club finishes in the top six and wins one of the European competitions, the seventh-place team will gain a Heineken Cup berth. However, if French clubs win both competitions, only five clubs will qualify for the 2011–12 Heineken Cup via their league position because France is capped at seven Heineken Cup places. France can also secure a seventh berth if clubs from England's Aviva Premiership, also capped at seven Heineken Cup places, win both Cup competitions, and the top club in the European Rugby Club Rankings among those not already qualified for the Heineken Cup is from the Top 14. Note, however, that if a winner of one of the European cups is relegated in the same season, LNR will not nominate it for European competition; its place will be taken by a current Top 14 side based on league position.

The bottom two teams are provisionally relegated to Pro D2, with the possibility of one or both of the bottom teams to be reprieved if a team above them fails a postseason financial audit (mandatory for all clubs in the league).

The LNR uses a slightly different bonus points system from that used in most other rugby competitions. It trialled a new system in 2007–08 explicitly designed to prevent a losing team from earning more than one bonus point in a match, a system that also made it impossible for either team to earn a bonus point in a drawn match. The LNR chose to continue with this system for subsequent seasons.

France's bonus point system operates as follows:

4 points for a win.
2 points for a draw.
1 "bonus" point for winning while scoring at least 3 more tries than the opponent. This replaces the standard bonus point for scoring 4 tries regardless of the match result.
1 "bonus" point for losing by 7 points (or less).

New developments

Salary cap
This season was the first in French rugby history to have a fixed salary cap. Previously, the only restrictions on team salaries were that wage bills were limited to 50% of turnover and that 10% of the salary budget had to be held in reserve. In December 2009, LNR announced that team payrolls would be limited to €8 million in 2010–11, and that the reserve requirement would be increased to 20%. The previous limitation of 50% of turnover remained in effect. However, rugby journalist Ian Moriarty dismissed the cap as "little more than a bit of sleight of hand by the LNR to appease a sporting public", noting that the announced cap was 5% greater than the highest official wage bill in the 2009–10 Top 14, and translated to £7.1 million at the time of announcement, well above the then-current £4 million cap in the English Premiership. Moriarty also added that clubs would likely find ways around the cap, noting, "Last season [2008–09], it's rumoured that one big, overseas name was paid less than 40% of his total income as a salary."

Domestic player rules
LNR also announced new rules requiring a minimum percentage of French players on team rosters. Under the new policy, "French players" are defined as those meeting the following criteria:
 Players 21 or over must have been registered with the French Rugby Federation (FFR) for at least five years before having turned 21.
 Players currently under 21 must have spent at least three seasons in an FFR-approved training centre.

The required percentage of French players was 40% this season, and will increase to 50% in 2011–12 and 60% in 2012–13.

Tax issues
A change in French tax law that took effect on 1 July 2010 raised concerns about the financial future of smaller clubs. The root of this issue is a French law known as DIC (Droit à l'Image Collectif), passed in 2004, that had allowed all French professional sports clubs to treat 30% of each player's salary as image rights. This portion of the salary was thus exempt from France's high employment and social insurance taxes, allowing French clubs to compete on a more equal financial footing with those in other European countries. However, the government announced in 2009 that it would suspend DIC.

The policy change was publicly criticized by wealthy club owners. Mourad Boudjellal of Toulon, who claimed that the change in the law would cost him more than €1 million in 2010–11, and Paul Goze of Perpignan took to the pitch before one of their matches to participate in a protest. Max Guazzini of Stade Français complained that the end of DIC would cost him about €800,000. However, the real concern in French rugby circles was for the potential blow to smaller clubs. Bourgoin, who only avoided a bankruptcy filing in 2009 by players agreeing to large wage cuts, faced an effective increase of €400,000 in their 2010–11 expenses. Brive had already announced that they would slash their budget by 40% for the 2010–11 season, but with a 2009–10 wage bill of €7.2 million and several high-profile players locked into long-term contracts, the increased tax bill was speculated to be a serious problem for the club.

Financial troubles at Bourgoin
Bourgoin's financial struggles became a major issue during the early summer of 2010. The club had been called in for a financial review by LNR's financial watchdog DNACG late in the 2009–10 season, which they survived with no action taken at that time. However, after the fixture list for the 2010–11 season was released, DNACG denied Bourgoin a professional license. Bourgoin appealed this ruling, and also considered pursuing legal action against LNR. Had Bourgoin been unsuccessful in their bid to stave off relegation, the choice of the team to replace them would not have been straightforward, as the most logical choice, Albi, who had been relegated after finishing at the bottom of the 2009–10 table, were facing their own financial problems and may not have had the resources for a Top 14 campaign. However, the FFR officially rescinded the DNACG's ruling on July 9, allowing Bourgoin to stay in the Top 14, thus also confirming Albi's place in Pro D2.

The teams

Note: Stade Francais have moved their home matches from their traditional home of Stade Jean-Bouin while a new 20,000-seat stadium is built on the site. The new Jean-Bouin is scheduled to open in 2013–14.

Table

{| class="wikitable" width="450px" style="float:left; font-size:95%; margin-left:15px;"
|colspan="2" style="text-align:center" bgcolor="#FFFFFF" cellpadding="0" cellspacing="0"|Key to colors
|-
| style="background: #FFF60F;" |     
| League champions; receive a place in the 2011–12 Heineken Cup.
|-
| style="background: #3fff00;" |     
| Top two teams qualify directly to semifinals and receive places in the 2011–12 Heineken Cup.
|-
| style="background: #d8ffeb;" |     
| Third and fourth placed teams play their quarterfinal at home and also receive automatic Heineken Cup berths.
|-
| style="background: #ccccff;" |     
| Fifth and sixth placed teams play their quarterfinal away and also receive automatic Heineken Cup berths (but see note 1 below).
|-
| style="background: #ff79B4;" |     
| Bottom two teams relegated to Rugby Pro D2.
|}

 :  On January 4, Bourgoin were docked five points by the DNACG because of a predicted deficit of 1.5 million euros. Bourgoin first decided to appeal this decision on January 10 before changing their minds on February 8, causing the point deduction to stand.

Notes
 It was possible that the sixth-place team on the table would not qualify for the Heineken Cup. However, it would have occurred only if French teams had won both the Heineken Cup and Amlin Challenge Cup, both of these teams had finished outside the top six on the league table and avoided relegation, and the sixth-place team had not advanced to the Top 14 final (under LNR regulations, the participants in the final receive the first two priority spots on its Heineken Cup entry list, ahead of a French Heineken Cup winner). This did not happen in 2010–11.
 Conversely, if the only French team to win a European trophy finished in the top six, or if both European trophy winners finished in the top six, the seventh-place finisher would receive a Heineken Cup berth. This also did not happen in 2010–11, as the cup winners were Leinster (Ireland, Heineken Cup) and Harlequins (England, Challenge Cup).

Results
As in recent seasons, several teams took occasional home matches to larger stadiums, either in their home city or a nearby location. In addition to Stade Français and Toulouse, whose use of larger venues is long-established, the following teams took home matches to other venues:
 Castres — Round 2 vs. Toulouse, Stade de la Méditerranée, Béziers
 Toulon — Round 7 vs. Clermont and Round 25 vs. Toulouse, Stade Vélodrome, Marseille
 Bourgoin — Round 12 vs. Toulouse and Round 20 vs. Racing Métro, Stade des Alpes, Grenoble
 Bayonne — Round 20 vs. Toulouse, Estadio Anoeta, Donostia-San Sebastián, Spain
 Biarritz — Round 22 vs. Bayonne, Estadio Anoeta
 Racing Métro — Round 22 vs. Toulouse, Stade de France, Saint-Denis

Key
The score of the game is given by the middle (third and fourth) columns. The first and last columns indicate the number of tries scored by the home and the away team, respectively. A blue border indicates that the team has earned an attacking bonus point (i.e. has scored at least three more tries than its opponent), a yellow one that the team has earned a defensive bonus point (defeat by 7 points or less).

Within each round, matches are listed in order of kickoff time. Matches with the same kickoff time are listed in alphabetic order of the home team. A dark horizontal line separates matches held on different dates.

Playoffs
   
  
All times are in Central European Summer Time (UTC+2).

Quarter-finals

Semi-finals

Final

Individual statistics
Correct as of June 5, 2011

Top points scorers

Top try scorers

See also
2010–11 Rugby Pro D2 season
2010–11 Heineken Cup
 Match Attd

Notes and references

External links
  Ligue Nationale de Rugby – Official website
 Top 14 on Planetrugby.com

Top 14 seasons
 
France